Seniko is a village and a community in the municipal unit of Selloi, Ioannina regional unit, Greece.  In 2011 its population was 77 for the village, and 131 for the community, which includes the villages Domolessa and Mikrochori.  It is built at 450 m above sea level, above the left bank of the river Tyria. It is 2.5 km north of Agios Nikolaos, 6 km south of Chinka, 13 km west of Dodoni and 23 km southwest of Ioannina.

Population

See also
List of settlements in the Ioannina regional unit

External links
Seniko at the GTP Travel Pages

References

Populated places in Ioannina (regional unit)